Federico Joel Mateos (born 28 March 1993) is an Argentine footballer who plays as a midfielder for Chilean Primera División side Universidad de Chile.

Career
After being in the Boca Juniors Youth Team, he joined Tigre playing for the Reserve Team. Later, he played for the Primera B Metropolitana sides Colegiales and San Telmo. In 2018 he joined Primera B de Chile side Ñublense, getting the promotion to Chilean Primera División for the 2021 season after becoming the 2020 Primera B de Chile champion.

Honours
Ñublense
 Primera B (1): 2020

References

External links
 
 
 Federico Mateos at playmakerstats.com (English version of ceroacero.es)

1993 births
Living people
Sportspeople from Buenos Aires Province
Argentine footballers
Club Atlético Tigre footballers
Club Atlético Colegiales (Argentina) players
San Telmo footballers
Ñublense footballers
Universidad de Chile footballers
Primera B Metropolitana players
Argentine Primera División players
Primera B de Chile players
Chilean Primera División players
Argentine expatriates in Chile
Argentine expatriate sportspeople in Chile
Expatriate footballers in Chile
Association football midfielders